Christopher John Rocco (born July 9, 1967), simply known as John Rocco  is an American illustrator of book covers and children's books. He is best known for illustrating the covers of books in the Percy Jackson & the Olympians series. He is the sole creator of some children's picture books.

Personal life

Rocco was raised in Barrington, Rhode Island. He studied illustration at the Rhode Island School of Design and at the School of Visual Arts in New York City and earned a degree from the latter.

Career

Rocco did not take drawing seriously until he was 19 years old. Rocco has also been an international art director in the entertainment industry. Rocco was the pre-production art director at DreamWorks for the film Shrek. He designed attractions at Disney's Epcot and served as art director for DisneyQuest.

Two companion books to the Percy Jackson series were published in 2014 and 2015, with lavish interior illustrations by Rocco, Percy Jackson's Greek Gods and Percy Jackson's Greek Heroes. Regarding the first Kirkus Reviews observed in a starred review, "Riordan has a sure touch when it comes to fitting much into a small space—as does Rocco’s artwork, which smokes and writhes on the page as if hit by lightning ...". John Rocco spent 18 months as animation director at ImagineAsia in Manila, Philippines.  Rocco worked on and oversaw several projects while there involving CGI animation, motion capture, and story development.

Awards
Rocco was a runner-up for the American Library Association Caldecott Medal, which annually recognizes the best in U.S. children's picture book illustration, when Blackout was named a Caldecott Honor Book in 2012. Rocco's book How We Got to the Moon was one of the ten books selected on the longlist for the 2020 National Book Award for Young People's Literature.

Borders Original Voices Award for best picture book
Original Art Show at the Society of Illustrators
New York Times Best Book of the Year
2015 Irma Black Award Honor for Blizzard;

Works

Children's books as writer

 Wolf! Wolf! (Hyperion Books for Children, 2007), picture book – "The Boy Who Cried Wolf" told from the wolf's point of view and set in Asia, Rocco's first book as writer
 Moonpowder (Hyperion Books for Children, 2008)
 Fu Finds the Way (Disney Hyperion, 2009)
 Blackout (Disney Hyperion, 2011)
 Super Hair-o and the Barber of Doom (Disney Hyperion, 2013)
 Blizzard (Disney Hyperion, October 2014),  – companion to Blackout; based on his Rhode Island childhood experience in the New England blizzard of 1978"BLIZZARD, by John Rocco, illustrated by John Rocco" (starred review). Kirkus Reviews. September 1, 2014. Retrieved 2015-11-05.
 Swim that Rock, Rocco and Jay Primiano (Candlewick Press, 2014), 293 pp. unillus.,  - a "middle grade/YA novel" by Rocco and an old friend, the "captain of the shellfishing boat I worked on as a child".

As illustrator only
Interior illustrations
 Alice, picture book written by Whoopi Goldberg (Bantam Books, 1992)
 Boy, Were We Wrong about the Solar System, Kathleen V. Kudlinski (Dutton Children's Books, 2008)
 The Flint Heart: a fairy story, Katherine and John Paterson (Candlewick, 2011) – "freely abridged from Eden Phillpotts's 1910 fantasy", 
 The Hunter Chronicles by E. J. Patten (Simon & Schuster Books for Children)
 Return to Exile (2011), snare 1, 
 The Legend Thief (2013), snare 2
 How to Train a Train, Jason Carter Eaton (Candlewick, 2013)
 Beep! Beep! Go to Sleep!, Todd Tarpley (Little, Brown, 2015)
 How to Track a Truck, Jason Carter Eaton (Candlewick, 2016)
 Percy Jackson's Greek Gods, Rick Riordan (Disney Hyperion, 2014) – illustrated with more than 60 paintings
 Percy Jackson's Greek Heroes, Rick Riordan (Disney Hyperion, 2015)

Cover and dustjacket art
 Camp Half-Blood chronicles by Rick Riordan (2005 to present) 
 The Kane Chronicles trilogy by Riordan (2010–2012)
 Magnus Chase and the Gods of Asgard trilogy by Riordan (2015–present)
Ring of Fire (novel) by Pierdomenico Baccalario (2009-2012) 

Another artist illustrated the first edition dustjacket for at least the first Camp Half-Blood novel by Rick Riordan, namely The Lightning Thief. Before the end of the Percy Jackson & the Olympians'' subseries (2005 to 2009), all volumes were in print with stylistically matching dustjackets illustrated by Rocco. New cover illustrations from a single Rocco painting that spans all five books were introduced early in 2014.

Notes

References

External links 

 
 
 

1967 births
American children's book illustrators

School of Visual Arts alumni
Living people